Denis Aleksandrovich Nikitin (born 5 May 1997) is a Russian football player. He plays for FC Biolog-Novokubansk.

Club career
He made his debut in the Russian Professional Football League for FC Avangard Kursk on 20 July 2016 in a game against FC Energomash Belgorod.

He made his Russian Football National League debut for FC Tosno on 1 April 2017 in a game against FC Baltika Kaliningrad.

References

External links
 
 
 Profile by Russian Professional Football League

1997 births
People from Mozdoksky District
Living people
Russian footballers
Association football defenders
FC Tosno players
FC Orenburg players
PFC CSKA Moscow players
FC Lokomotiv Moscow players
FC Avangard Kursk players
FC Yenisey Krasnoyarsk players
FC Dynamo Bryansk players
Russian First League players
Russian Second League players
Sportspeople from North Ossetia–Alania